SMRT Trains Limited is a rail operator in Singapore and a wholly owned subsidiary of SMRT Corporation. After the privatisation of the MRT operations in 1995, it was originally named Singapore MRT Limited. On 31 December 2001, it was renamed to SMRT Trains Limited, so as not to confuse with another MRT line - North East MRT Line that is under Singapore Bus Services and the bus operations merged from Trans-Island Bus Services. At the same time, Singapore Bus Services was renamed to SBS Transit to be multi-modal. SMRT Trains currently manages most of the MRT services in Singapore except the North East Line and Downtown Line.

History 
SMRT Trains Limited was incorporated as the rail subsidiary arm of the parent company SMRT Corporation, to oversee rail operations brought over from the previously state-owned Mass Rapid Transit Corporation (MRTC).

Mass Rapid Transit Corporation (MRTC) 

The Singapore MRT Limited was incorporated on 6 August 1987, and signed the licence and operating agreement (LOA) with MRTC, a government-run corporation till 1997. On 7 November 1987, MRTC started services on Singapore's first MRT section, consisting of five stations from Yio Chu Kang to Toa Payoh. When the MRTC merged to form LTA on 1 Sep 1995, operations of the MRTC were hived off into SMRT Corporation. On 1998, the light rail operation was formed and was called Singapore LRT Limited. On 31 December 2001, both Singapore MRT Limited and Singapore LRT Limited were merged into the present name, SMRT Trains.

Transition to New Rail Financing Framework (NRFF) 
On 15 July 2016, SMRT Trains and its subsidiary SMRT Light Rail concluded discussions on the transition of the North-South and East-West Lines (NSEWL), the Circle Line (CCL) and the Bukit Panjang LRT (BPLRT) to the New Rail Financing Framework (NRFF). The framework, announced by the Government in 2008 under the Land Transport Master-plan, was introduced as an enhancement to the 1996 Rail Financing Framework, and was first implemented for the Downtown Line (DTL) in 2011. SMRT transited to a 15-year contract under the new framework from 1 October 2016, with the transfer of ownership of all its rail assets at a net value of $1.06 billion to the government.

Mass Rapid Transit
SMRT Trains currently operates a fleet consisting of six rolling stocks built on its two heavy rail lines (the North South Line and the East West Line) – namely C151, C651, C751B, C151A, C151B, C151C and R151, identified by the relevant build contracts. In addition, it operates the C830 and C830C rolling stocks, which operates on the Circle Line. SMRT Trains is also licensed to operate the CT251 rolling stocks, which operates on the Thomson-East Coast Line. SMRT Light Rail operates the C801 and the C801A rolling stocks on the Bukit Panjang LRT Line. The C851E will be added to SMRT's fleet in tandem with the opening of the CCL6 line.

The main colour scheme for all trains are black with a red stripe. C651 is the only train model with an exterior livery of white and red stripes. C801 is the only train model with an exterior livery of blue and red stripes. C151B and C801A are the only train models with an exterior livery of the new SMRT pixelated livery, which consist of white, red, black and yellow stripes and pixel livery. C151C and CR151 will bear the new LTA livery, which is black with green and red stripes. CT251 will also bear the new LTA livery, which is black with brown and yellow stripes.

Fleet

 The trains are classified as contracts unlike other countries which uses "class".

Light Rail Transit
SMRT Light Rail operates only one LRT line. The Bukit Panjang LRT Line provides feeder connections at Bukit Panjang and Choa Chu Kang towns to the Downtown line at Bukit Panjang and North South line and the upcoming Jurong Region line at Choa Chu Kang.

Fleet

 The trains are classified as contracts unlike other countries which uses "class".

Notable incidents
 Before the start of service, a maintenance vehicle spilt oil on the tracks between Clementi and Jurong East. The first ten eastbound trains reported braking problems. Then, at 7.50 am on 5 August 1993, the eleventh east-bound train from Jurong stopped at the Clementi Station for two minutes longer than scheduled due to it using its emergency brakes to stop at the station, and was then hit by the twelfth east bound train when it failed to stop in time. 156 passengers were injured by the collision.
 Pasir Ris rail accident: On 22 March 2016, 2 SMRT staff were killed when a train hit them near Pasir Ris station along the EWL. Following an audit and investigation, the Ministry of Manpower (Singapore) reported that SMRT had  failed to follow safety procedures to ensure worker safety for the past 14 years. Former assistant engineer Lim Say Heng pleaded guilty to one charge of causing the deaths of the trainees  by failing to observe critical safety protocol and was sentenced to four weeks jail.
 Joo Koon rail accident: On 15 November 2017, two C151A trains collided at Joo Koon, injuring 28 people, making the second incident after 24 years on 5 August 1993 when two C151 trains collided at Clementi.

Notes

References

1987 establishments in Singapore
SMRT Corporation
Mass Rapid Transit (Singapore)
Railway companies of Singapore
Railway companies established in 1987